Hilja Varem (since 1960 Hilja Vee; born on 19 July 1934 in Põltsamaa) is an Estonian actress.

From 1956 until 1959, she worked at Ugala Theatre, from 1959 until 1975 at Endla Theatre, and from 1976 until 1992 at Noorsooteater. Besides theatre roles she has also appeared  several films.

Awards:
 1974: Estonian SSR merited artist

Selected filmography
 1959 Kutsumata külalised (feature film; role: Hilda) 
 1967 Tütarlaps mustas (feature film; role: Helvi)
 1969 Gladiaator (feature film)
 1970 Agu Sihvka annab aru (television film; role: Teacher) 
 1974 Ohtlikud mängud (feature film; role: Old man's mother) 
 1976 Aeg elada, aeg armastada	(feature film; role: Dressing room nurse) 
 1981 Karge meri	(feature film; role: Huigo's wife) 
 1989 Varastatud kohtumine (feature film; role: Johanna Uibo) 
 1989 Äratus (feature film; role: Nuudimäe Armilde)
 1990 Regina (feature film; role: Ants' mother)

References

1934 births
Living people
Estonian film actresses
Estonian stage actresses
Estonian television actresses
Estonian radio actresses
20th-century Estonian actresses
People from Põltsamaa